Syntaxin-6 is a protein that in humans is encoded by the STX6 gene.

Interactions 

STX6 has been shown to interact with SNAP23, VAMP3 and VAMP4.

N terminal protein domain 
The protein domain Syntaxin 6 N terminal protein domain is a  soluble N-ethylmaleimide-sensitive factor attachment protein receptor (SNARE) found in endosomal transport vesicles. It is part of the family, of target SNAREs (t-SNAREs). It is a vital aid to exporting and importing cell cargo through a process called cell trafficking. Its SNARE motif shows significant homology to both syntaxin 1a and S25C, indicating similarity through evolutionary conservation. The structure of the syntaxin 6 N-terminal domain shows strong structural similarity with the N-terminal domains of  syntaxin 1a, Sso1p, and Vam3p; despite a very low level of sequence similarity. SNARE functions essentially as a tether to hold the vesicle. The cytoplasmic regions of SNARE found on transport vesicles and target membranes interact, then a four-helix coiled coil forms. This links the  cell membrane and vesicles together in such a way that it overcomes the energetic barrier to fusing two lipid bilayers. This is the way cell cargo is exchanged. This particular entry focuses on the N-terminal domain of Syntaxin 6.

Structure 
Members of this entry, which are found in the amino terminus of various SNARE proteins, adopt a structure consisting of an antiparallel three-helix bundle. Their exact function has not been determined, though it is known that they regulate the SNARE motif, as well as mediate various protein-protein interactions involved in membrane-transport.

Function 
SNAREs play a vital role in the trafficking of cell cargo. The vesicles fuse to the cell membrane with the help of SNARE proteins. The SNARE motifs form a four-helix bundle that contributes to the fusion of two membranes. More specifically, the N-terminal domain binds
to the SNARE motif, and this intramolecular interaction decreases the rate of association with the partner SNARE. However the N terminal domain's function still remains to fully elucidated.

References

Further reading

External links